The Renault RS01 was the first Formula One car to be powered by a turbocharged engine. It was also the first to use radial tyres, which were provided by Michelin. Designed by André de Cortanze and Jean-Pierre Jabouille, it first appeared at the 1977 British Grand Prix. The rules of F1 at the time permitted 3.0 litre engines of natural aspiration, with a clause for a 1.5 litre supercharged or turbocharged engine. None of the teams had pursued this avenue, and stuck to Ford Cosworth DFV engines, whilst Ferrari, Matra and Alfa Romeo concentrated on developing Flat-12 engines for their cars, and their customer teams of Ligier and Brabham. Leading French car manufacturer Renault decided to develop a 1.5 litre turbocharged engine, and a car to accompany the powerplant.

Development

Team Lotus had introduced ground effect with the Lotus 78, while Tyrrell were using the six wheeled Tyrrell P34. Renault continued the innovatory path with their car, drawing on the knowledge gained from their turbocharged 2.0L V6 engine used in Sports car racing which culminated in finishing 2nd at Le Mans in 1977 and winning in 1978, proving that Renault's turbocharged engines could not only be powerful, but reliable.

The RS01 appeared cumbersome and overweight and indeed it was. But it was nothing more than an experimental test car at this stage, and Jabouille, who was also the team's driver, worked hard to develop it. The engine block was made in cast iron to withstand the pressures of turbocharging, whilst the chassis itself was kept as uncomplicated as possible to aid development.

Race history
To begin with the car was chronically unreliable and earned the nickname 'the yellow teapot' from rival teams (it tended to blow up fairly regularly, usually in a cloud of white smoke), but Jabouille and the team pressed on throughout the rest of 1977 and 1978 until they brought the car home to its first points, a fourth place at the 1978 United States Grand Prix at Watkins Glen. The car had been developed so much it barely resembled the chunky machine that it had been when it first appeared, and the team's performance had picked up throughout the season. Reliability had started to be found, and the yawning turbo lag had been overcome by using twin turbochargers.

The RS01 started the  season for the team and Jabouille used the car to score the first pole position for a turbo car at the South African Grand Prix at Kyalami, a circuit located at high altitude where the thinner air saw the turbos operating at their maximum while the naturally aspirated cars such as the flat 12 Ferrari and Alfa Romeos, and the V8 Cosworth DFV, actually lost approximately 20% of their power compared to at sea level.

Within three years most of the other teams would begin adopting turbochargers for themselves, with Ferrari, Alfa, and other manufacturers such as BMW, Honda and Porsche all supplying turbocharged engines.

Complete Formula One results
(key) (results in bold indicate pole position; results in italics indicate fastest lap)

All points were scored using the Renault RS10

References

Sources 
The Concise Encyclopedia of Formula One by David Tremayne

Further reading

Alpine & Renault Development of the Revolutionary Turbo F1 car

External links

RS01
1979 Formula One season cars